The 15th Moscow International Film Festival was held from 6 to 17 July 1987. The Golden Prize was awarded to the Italian film Intervista directed by Federico Fellini.

Jury
 Robert De Niro (United States – President of the Jury)
 Tengiz Abuladze (USSR)
 Souheil Ben-Barka (Morocco)
 Antonio Gades (Spain)
 Rustam Ibragimbekov (USSR)
 Alberto Isaac (Mexico)
 Alexandre Mnouchkine (France)
 Gian Luigi Rondi (Italy)
 Zheng Xiuelai (China)
 Hanna Schygulla (West Germany)
 Miklós Jancsó (Hungary)

Films in competition
The following films were selected for the main competition:

Awards
 Golden Prize: Intervista by Federico Fellini
 Special Prizes:
 Courier by Karen Shakhnazarov
 Hero of the Year by Feliks Falk
 Prizes:
 Best Actor: Anthony Hopkins for 84 Charing Cross Road
 Best Actress: Dorottya Udvaros for Love, Mother
 Prix FIPRESCI: Hero of the Year by Feliks Falk

References

External links
Moscow International Film Festival: 1987 at Internet Movie Database

1987
1987 film festivals
1987 in the Soviet Union
1987 in Moscow
July 1987 events in Europe